The 2013–14 Seattle Redhawks men's basketball team represented Seattle University during the 2013–14 NCAA Division I men's basketball season. The Redhawks, led by fifth year head coach Cameron Dollar, played their home games at KeyArena, with one home game at the ShoWare Center, and were a members of the Western Athletic Conference. They finished the season 13–17, 5–11 in WAC play to finish in a three way tie for seventh place. They lost in the quarterfinals of the WAC tournament to New Mexico State.

Roster

Schedule

|-
!colspan=9 style="background:#BA0C2F; color:#FFFFFF;"| Regular season

|-
!colspan=9 style="background:#BA0C2F; color:#FFFFFF;"| WAC tournament

Source:

References

Seattle Redhawks men's basketball seasons
Seattle
Seattle Seahawks Washington (state)
Seattle Redhawks men's basketball
Seattle Redhawks
Seattle Redhawks